The Aporé River (Portuguese, Rio Aporé, also called Rio do Peixe) is a river forming the border between Goiás and Mato Grosso do Sul states in central Brazil. It is a tributary of the Paranaíba River, which it enters in the reservoir created by Ilha Solteira Dam on the Paraná River.

See also
 List of rivers of Goiás
 List of rivers of Mato Grosso do Sul
 Tributaries of the Río de la Plata

References

Brazilian Ministry of Transport

Rivers of Goiás
Rivers of Mato Grosso do Sul
Tributaries of the Paraná River